Bazarnosyzgansky District  is an administrative and municipal district (raion), one of the twenty-one in Ulyanovsk Oblast, Russia. It is located in the west of the oblast. Its administrative center is the urban locality (a work settlement) of Bazarny Syzgan. Population: 10,083 (2010 Census);  The population of Bazarny Syzgan accounts for 56.7% of the district's total population.

History
The district was first established in 1935. In 1956, it was merged into Inzensky District. It was re-established in 1989.

References

Notes

Sources

Districts of Ulyanovsk Oblast
